Song Ruixiang (born October 1939) is a Chinese politician who served as governor of Qinghai from 1985 to 1989,  from 1994 to 1998, and director of the China Earthquake Administration from 2002 to 2004.

He was a member of the 15th Central Committee of the Chinese Communist Party and a member of the Standing Committee of the 10th Chinese People's Political Consultative Conference..

Biography
Song was born in Jintan County (now Jintan District of Changzhou), Jiangsu, in October 1939. 

Starting in 1957, he successively served as technician, engineer, deputy division director, and deputy director of the Hunan Provincial Geological Bureau. He was deputy director and then director of the Qinghai Provincial Bureau of Geology and Mineral Resources from April 1982 to June 1985. In July 1985, he was promoted to become deputy party secretary and governor of Qinghai, and served until September 1989. In October 1989, he became , rising to minister in April 1994. He was appointed director of the State Environmental Protection Administration in April 1998, concurrently holding the deputy director of the National Mineral Resources Commission position. He was chosen as director of the China Earthquake Administration in January 2002, and held that office until December 2004. He retired in December 2009.

References

1939 births
Living people
People from Changzhou
Governors of Qinghai
People's Republic of China politicians from Jiangsu
Chinese Communist Party politicians from Jiangsu
Members of the 15th Central Committee of the Chinese Communist Party
Members of the Standing Committee of the 10th Chinese People's Political Consultative Conference